Adherents of Jainism first arrived in the United States in the 20th century. Jain immigration began in earnest in the late 1960s and continues to the present day.

History

In 1893, Virachand Gandhi became the first Jain delegate to visit the United States, representing Jainism in the first ever Parliament of World Religions. As the first practicing Jain to speak publicly in the United States on Jainism, he is a key figure in the history of American Jainism. The first St. Louis Jain temple in the United States was built for the St. Louis World's Fair in 1904. After the fair, the temple moved to Las Vegas and later to Los Angeles. It is now owned by the Jain Center of Southern California. Adherents of Jainism first arrived in the United States in 1944. Jain immigration began in earnest in the late 1960s after the passage of the Immigration Act of 1965. The United States has since become a center of the Jain diaspora.

The first former Jain monastic to travel to the United States, Chitrabhanu, arrived in 1971. He gave several lectures about Jainism at Harvard University and established a Jain center in New York City. The first monk who traveled outside India by use of mechanical means was Acharya Sushil Kumar who arrived in the United States in 1975. He established multiple Jain centers, including International Mahavira Jain Mission popularly known as Siddhachalam. In the 1980s, he and Chitrabhanu inspired the founding of Federation of Jain Associations in North America to support the Jain community in the United States and Canada.

As of 2010 the United States contained the most Jain temples of any country in the Jain diaspora. At least one third of the Jains living outside India live in the United States, numbering close to 150,000. Jain temples in the United States, which numbered 26 as of 2006, frequently incorporate marble and arches in a style reminiscent of Rajasthan architecture. There are almost 100 distinct Jain congregations in the United States.

Many Jains in the United States are professionals. They also frequently volunteer at animal welfare organizations. Many Jains also attend Hindu temples and Hindu events.

Jain sects
According to The Pluralism Project at Harvard University, "Most American Jains agree that the sectarian streams of Jainism that have been significant in India for 2,000 years are fast losing their currency in 20th century America...The sectarian divisions of the Jain tradition have been left behind as Jain Americans concentrate on the difficult task of appropriating the tradition in a new environment." As noted below, many Jain temples in the United States contain images from both the Digambara and Śvētāmbara traditions. Jain conventions and gatherings in America feature teachings from both sects.

Federation of Jain Associations in North America and Siddhachalam 

The Federation of Jain Associations in North America is an umbrella organization of local American and Canadian Jain congregations to preserve, practice, and promote Jainism and the Jain way of life. Siddhachalam in New Jersey is the first pilgrimage site for Jains outside India, bringing together all Jains in one place for worship, study and reflection.

Jain symbols

The Federation of Jain Associations in North America uses a modified version of the standard Jain symbol, the Jain emblem. It replaces the swastika with an om because the former is not considered a pious symbol in the western world.

Jain studies
Florida International University hosts the Bhagwan Mahavir Professorship in Jain Studies, the first Jain Studies chair at a North American university. In 2016, the Jain Society and Rice University signed a memorandum of understanding to establish a post-doctoral fellowship in Jain studies.

American Jain centers
:Category:Jain temples in the United States

The Jain Center of America was the first Jain center in the United States. It opened in New York City in 1982. Since then, over 100 Jain centers and temples have opened in America. Most Jain centers are complexes that include a main temple housing Digambara and Śvētāmbara images, libraries, meeting rooms, guest rooms, and so forth.

Arizona
 Jain Center of Greater Phoenix

California
 Jain Center of Northern California
 Jain Center of Southern California
 Jain Center of Greater Sacramento
 Jain Society of San Diego
 Jain Center Of Los Angeles

Colorado
 Jain Samaj of Colorado, Denver

Connecticut
 Jain Center of Connecticut

Florida
 Jain Vishwa Bharati of USA, Orlando, Florida 
 Jain Society Inc. of Tampa Bay
 Jain Society of Central Florida, Inc.
 Jain Center of South Florida
 Jain Association of North East Florida

Georgia
 Augusta Jain Community
 Jain Society of Greater Atlanta

Illinois
 Jain Society of Metro Chicago

Indiana
 Jain Center of Central Indiana

Kansas
 Kansas City Jain Sangh

Louisiana
 Jain Center of Northwest Louisiana

Maryland
 Jain Society of Metro Washington

Massachusetts
 Jain Sangh of New England, Burlington, Massachusetts
 Jain Center of Greater Boston, Norwood, Massachusetts

Michigan
 Jain Society of Greater Detroit, Inc.
 Jain Society of Greater Lansing

Minnesota
 Jain Center of Minnesota

Missouri
 Jain Center of Greater St. Louis

Nevada
 Jain Center of Las Vegas

New Jersey
 Jain Center of New Jersey
 Jain Sangh of Atlantic City - NJ
 The Jain Sangh Inc. NJ (Cherry Hill Jain Sangh)
 Jain Vishwa Bharti, Iselin, New Jersey 
 Siddhachalam, New Jersey

New York

 Jain Center of America
 Jain Community of Buffalo
 Jain Sangh of Hudson Valley
 Jain Society of Capitol District-Albany
 Jain Samaj of Long Island, NY
 Jain Temple of New York

North Carolina
 Jain Center of Greater Charlotte
 Jain Study Center of N. Carolina

Ohio
 Jain Center of Central Ohio, Columbus
 Jain Center of Cincinnati/Dayton
 Jain Society of Greater Cleveland
 Jain Society of Toledo

Oklahoma
 Tulsa Jain Sangh

Pennsylvania
 Jain Center of Allentown
 Jain Samaj of South Central PA
 Jain Society of Pittsburgh
 Samarpan Jain Sangh Philadelphia

Tennessee
 Jain Society of Middle Tennessee

Texas
 Jain Society of Houston
 Jain Society of N. Texas/Dallas
 Jain Sangh of Greater Austin TX
 Siddhayatan

Virginia
 Jain Society of Central Virginia - Richmond
 Jain Temple of Virginia

Washington
 Jain Society of Seattle
 Jain Center of Washington

Wisconsin
 Jain Religion Center of Wisconsin

Gallery

See also

 Jainism in Canada
 Jainism in Europe
 Jainism in Hong Kong
 Jainism in Singapore
Jain Center of Southern California

References

Further reading
 Jainism in America Bhuvanendra Kumar. Benaras, Jain Humanities Press, 1996
 The Western Order of Jainism by Nathubhai Shah of London (Jain Journal Vol XXX1, No 1 July 1996)
 Jains and Their Religion in America: A Social Survey by Dr. Bhuvannendra Kumar (Jain Journal Vol XXX1, No 1 July 1996)
 JAIN eLibrary attempts to provide an increasingly complete digitized collection of Jain Scriptures, dictionaries, encyclopedias, articles, commentaries, photographs, and other materials related to Jain life.

External links
 Federation of Jain Associations in North America (JAINA)

 
Jain communities
Asian-American society